A chocolate chip cookie is a drop cookie that features chocolate chips or chocolate morsels as its distinguishing ingredient. Chocolate chip cookies originated in the United States in 1938, when Ruth Graves Wakefield chopped up a Nestlé semi-sweet chocolate bar and added the chopped chocolate to a cookie recipe.

Generally, the recipe starts with a dough composed of flour, butter, both brown and white sugar, semi-sweet chocolate chips, eggs, and vanilla. Variations on the recipe may add other types of chocolate, as well as additional ingredients such as nuts or oatmeal. There are also vegan versions with the necessary ingredient substitutions, such as vegan chocolate chips, vegan margarine, and egg substitutes. A chocolate chocolate chip cookie uses a dough flavored with chocolate or cocoa powder, before chocolate chips are mixed in. These variations of the recipe are also referred to as ‘double’ or ‘triple’ chocolate chip cookies, depending on the combination of dough and chocolate types.

History

Invention
The chocolate chip cookie was invented by American chef Ruth Graves Wakefield in 1938. She invented the recipe during the period when she owned the Toll House Inn, in Whitman, Massachusetts. In this era, the Toll House Inn was a popular restaurant that featured home cooking. A myth holds that she accidentally developed the cookie, and that she expected the chocolate chunks would melt, making chocolate cookies. That is not the case; Wakefield stated that she deliberately invented the cookie. She said, "We had been serving a thin butterscotch nut cookie with ice cream. Everybody seemed to love it, but I was trying to give them something different. So I came up with Toll House cookie." She added chopped up bits from a Nestlé semi-sweet chocolate bar into a cookie. The original recipe in Toll House Tried and True Recipes is called "Toll House Chocolate Crunch Cookies". Wakefield gave Nestle the recipe for her cookies and was paid with a lifetime supply of chocolate from the company.

Later history
Wakefield's cookbook, Toll House Tried and True Recipes, was first published in 1936 by M. Barrows & Company, New York. The 1938 edition of the cookbook was the first to include the recipe "Toll House Chocolate Crunch Cookie" which rapidly became a favorite cookie in American homes.

During World War II, soldiers from Massachusetts who were stationed overseas shared the cookies they received in care packages from home with soldiers from other parts of the United States. Hundreds of soldiers wrote home asking their families to send them Toll House cookies, and Wakefield received letters from around the world requesting her recipe, helping spread their popularity beyond the east coast. Chocolate chip cookies were first sold in the UK in 1956 by Maryland Cookies.

Original recipe
The original recipe was passed down to Sue Brides' daughter, Peg, who shared it in a 2017 interview:

  cups (350 mL) shortening
  cups (265 mL) sugar
  cups (265 mL) brown sugar
 3 eggs
  teaspoon (7.5 g) salt
  cups (750 mL) of flour
  teaspoon (7.5 g) hot water
  teaspoon (7.5 g) baking soda
  teaspoon (7.5 g) vanilla
 chocolate chips (The Tried and True Recipes cookbook specifies "2 bars (7 oz.) Nestlé's yellow label chocolate, semi-sweet, which has been cut in pieces the size of a pea.").

Marketing

There are at least three national (U.S./North America) chains that sell freshly baked chocolate chip cookies in shopping malls and standalone retail locations. Several businesses—including Doubletree hotels—offer freshly baked cookies to their patrons to differentiate themselves from their competition.

To honor the cookie's creation in the state, on July 9, 1997, Massachusetts designated the chocolate chip cookie as the Official State Cookie, after it was proposed by a third-grade class from Somerset, Massachusetts.

Composition and variants

Chocolate chip cookies are commonly made with white sugar; brown sugar; flour; salt; eggs; a leavening agent such as baking soda; a fat, typically butter or shortening; vanilla extract; and chocolate pieces. Some recipes also include milk or nuts (such as chopped walnuts) in the dough.

Depending on the ratio of ingredients and mixing and cooking times, some recipes produce a soft, chewy cookie while others will produce a crunchy, crispy cookie. Regardless of ingredients, the procedure for making the cookie is fairly consistent in all recipes: First, the sugars and fat are creamed, usually with a wooden spoon or electric mixer. Next, the eggs and vanilla extract are added followed by the flour and leavening agent. Depending on the additional flavoring, its addition to the mix will be determined by the type used: peanut butter will be added with the wet ingredients while cocoa powder would be added with the dry ingredients. The titular ingredient, chocolate chips, as well as nuts are typically mixed in towards the end of the process to minimize breakage, just before the cookies are scooped and positioned on a cookie sheet. Most cookie dough is baked, although some eat the dough as is, or use it as an addition to vanilla ice cream to make chocolate chip cookie dough ice cream.

The texture of a chocolate chip cookie is largely dependent on its fat composition and the type of fat used. A study done by Kansas State University showed that carbohydrate-based fat substitutes tend to bind more water, leaving less water available to aid in the spread of the cookie while baking and resulting in softer, cakelike cookies with less spread.

Common variants

 The M&M party cookie is baked with M&M's instead of chocolate chips.
 The chocolate chocolate chip or double chocolate cookie uses a dough that is chocolate flavored by the addition of cocoa or melted chocolate. Variations on this cookie include replacing chocolate chips with white chocolate or peanut butter chips.
 The macadamia chip cookie has macadamia nuts and white chocolate chips.
 The chocolate chip peanut butter cookie replaces the vanilla flavored dough with a peanut butter flavored one.
 Chocolate chip cookie dough baked in a baking dish instead of a cookie sheet results in a chocolate chip bar cookie, also known as congo bars or blondies.
 Other variations include different sizes and shapes of chocolate chips, as well as dark or milk chocolate chips. These changes lead to differences in both flavor and texture.

Popular brands

 Blue Chip Cookies
 Chips Ahoy! (Nabisco)
 Chips Deluxe (Keebler)
 Cookie Time
 Famous Amos
 Maryland Cookies
 Mrs. Fields
 Otis Spunkmeyer
 Pepperidge Farm

See also

 Oatmeal raisin cookie
 Peanut butter cookie

References

External links

 Nestle Toll House Cookie recipe

American desserts
Articles containing video clips
Chocolate desserts
Cookies
1938 establishments in the United States
Food and drink introduced in 1938
Massachusetts cuisine
New England cuisine
American inventions

fr:Cookie (cuisine)